Rasskazovsky District is an administrative and municipal district (raion), one of the twenty-three in Tambov Oblast, Russia. It is located in the center of the oblast. The district borders with Bondarsky District in the north, Kirsanovsky District in the east, Sampursky District in the south, and with Tambovsky District in the west. Its administrative center is the town of Rasskazovo (which is not administratively a part of the district). Population: 22,991 (2010 Census);

Administrative and municipal status
Within the framework of administrative divisions, Rasskazovsky District is one of the twenty-three in the oblast. The town of Rasskazovo serves as its administrative center, despite being incorporated separately as a town of oblast significance—an administrative unit with the status equal to that of the districts.

As a municipal division, the district is incorporated as Rasskazovsky Municipal District. The town of oblast significance of Rasskazovo is incorporated separately from the district as Rasskazovo Urban Okrug.

References

Notes

Sources

Districts of Tambov Oblast
